Black Star at the Point of Darkness is a spoken word album by American composer and author Paul Bowles, consisting of several poems, orchestral pieces, and recordings made in his travels.  The recordings were produced by American musician, writer and producer, Randall Barnwell for his own company, Istikhara Music.

Track listing
 Sounds from the Jemaa El Fna, Marrakech - 0:47
 "Here I Am" (poem) - 0:45
 "The Empty Amulet" - 10:41
 Qsbah solo by Zaan of the Jilala de Tanger (recorded by Paul Bowles circa 1978) - 1:27
 "An Inopportune Visit" - 11:27
 Music in the village of the Amara, High Atlas Mountains (recorded by Paul Bowles circa 1960) - 4:11
 "The Successor" - 7:57
 "Six Preludes for Piano" (composed by Paul Bowles, performed by Jean-Luc Fafchamps) - 6:20
 "Nights" (poem) - 0:38

External links
 Spoken Word and Audio Recordings of Paul Bowles
 Sub Rosa album detail

1990 albums
Sub Rosa Records albums
Works by Paul Bowles
Articles with dead external links from June 2012
Spoken word albums by American artists